Mick Pender (17 November 1868 – 23 November 1924) was an Australian rules footballer who played with Carlton in the Victorian Football League (VFL).

Notes

External links 

Mick Pender's profile at Blueseum

1868 births
1924 deaths
Australian rules footballers from Melbourne
Carlton Football Club players
People from Williamstown, Victoria